In manufacturing engineering, process layout is a design for the floor plan of a plant which aims to improve efficiency by arranging equipment according to its function. The production line should ideally be designed to eliminate waste in material flows, inventory handling and management. 
In process layout, the work stations and machinery are not arranged according to a particular production sequence. Instead, there is an assembly of similar operations or similar machinery in each department (for example, a drill department, a paint department, etc.)

It is also known as function layout. In this layout machining operation are performed in group together and not arranged according to any sequence.

Main advantages 
 Provide visual control of activities
 Use space efficiently

 Eliminate bottlenecks
 Facilitate communication and interaction  between workers and supervisors
 It is environmental friendly

Criticism 
A common criticism of this layout is that the work can be monotonous for staff, especially if they are involved only in one stage of the process.
This criticism can however be eliminated if the staff are rotated to different departments (involving different processes) thus developing a multi-skilled body of staff.

See also 
 Product layout

References

Further reading 
 S.N. Chary (2006). Production and Operations Management. McGraw Hill. 
 S. Moran (2016). Process Plant Layout. Elsevier.  

Industrial engineering